Actephila grandifolia is a species of plant in the family Phyllanthaceae. A shrub to 3 metres tall, found in north eastern New South Wales to south eastern Queensland. The habitat is the understorey of sub tropical rainforest or moist eucalyptus forest on basalt soils.

References 

grandifolia
Flora of New South Wales
Flora of Queensland